Hugh Cressy may refer to:

 Serenus de Cressy (c. 1605–1674), English monk
 Hugh Cressy (MP), Member of Parliament (MP) for Nottinghamshire
 Hugh de Cressy (died 1189), Anglo-Norman administrator and nobleman